Jawahar Navodaya Vidyalaya Amroha (also known as JNV Amroha or JNV Baseda Taga) is a boarding school, set up in Amroha, India, in 2000. It is an autonomous body which works under the Department of Education, Ministry of Human Resource Development (India). The concept of opening a boarding school, called Navodaya Vidyalaya, in every district of India was born as a part of the section 5.15 in New Policy on Education (NPE86). Jawahar Navodaya Vidyalaya Amroha has a campus of 35 acres, close to  Saidpur Mafi Bijnor on NH -76, in  Baseda Taga, Amroha. It is a fully residential boarding school which provides accommodation to students, faculty and staff.

History
JNV Baseda Taga Amroha Nagar was established in 2000. The school sprawls over 35 acre of land, full of lush green trees. It educates children mainly from a rural background. Affiliated with the CBSE the school imparts education in the streams of Science and Commerce.  The third language of the school is [
The campus is on 35 acre of land, with two boys hostel, one girls hostel, 42 staff apartments, administrative block, academic building, one multipurpose hall and one dining halls where more than 500 students take their breakfast, lunch and dinner, a  library with approximately 6500 books and magazines, including magazine and news papers in Hindi, English and Kannada languages. The Career Corner has books for exams and professional courses.
 There is a Computer lab having 25 computers with one server connected with LAN also including broad band Internet facility.
 There is a playground with a 400-metre 8 lane track, two basketball grounds, one handball ground, five volleyball grounds, two Kho-Kho grounds, two Kabbadi grounds, one football ground, multiple TT tables and a gymnasium.
 Physics, Chemistry and Biology, mathematics laboratories.

References

External links 
  Jawahar Navodaya Vidyalaya Baseda Taga Amroha
  Navodaya Vidyalaya Samiti
  All India Navodaya Alumni Association ( AINAA)
 Jawahar Navodaya Vidyalaya

Jawahar Navodaya Vidyalayas in Uttar Pradesh
Boarding schools in Uttar Pradesh
High schools and secondary schools in Uttar Pradesh
Amroha
Educational institutions established in 2000
2000 establishments in Uttar Pradesh